Escadrille Spa.94 (originally Escadrille N.94) was a French fighter squadron active from mid-1917 until World War I ended on 11 November 1918. While it spent 1918 merged into larger formations, the squadron destroyed 42 enemy aircraft.

History

French aviation Detachments N.512, N.513, and N.514 were merged at Melette, France on 14 May 1917 to found Escadrille N.94. It used Nieuport 24 and Nieuport 27 fighters to support IV Armee. On 30 January 1918, the squadron was one of four merged at Villeneuve to form Groupe de Combat 18, which in turn was one of three Groupe de Combats merged to become Escadre de Combat No. 1. 

In February 1918, the squadron refitted with SPAD fighters, becoming Escadrille Spa.94. On 4 October 1918, the Escadre was Mentioned in dispatches; thus, Escadrille Spa.94 won a citation. By war's end on 11 November 1918, the squadron was credited with 42 confirmed aerial victories.

Commanding officers
 Capitaine Edouard Pillet: 14 May 1917 – late April 1918
 Lieutenant de la Rochefordiere: Late April 1918 – killed in action 11 June 1918
 Lieutenant Jean Bozon-Verduraz: 11 June 1918 until war's end

Notable members
 Sous lieutenant Pierre Marinovitch
 Sous lieutenant André-Henri Martenot de Cordou

Aircraft

 Nieuport 24 fighters: 14 May 1917 – February 1918
 Nieuport 27 fighters: 14 May 1917 – February 1918
 SPAD fighters: February 1918 onwards

End notes

References
 Franks, Norman; Bailey, Frank (1993). Over the Front: The Complete Record of the Fighter Aces and Units of the United States and French Air Services, 1914–1918 London, UK: Grub Street Publishing. .

Further reading
 Guttman, Jon. (2016). Grim Reapers: French Escadrille 94 in World War I. Aeronaut Books. 

Fighter squadrons of the French Air and Space Force
Military units and formations established in 1917
Military units and formations disestablished in 1918
Military units and formations of France in World War I
Military aviation units and formations in World War I